is a sometimes hot East Asian pepper variety of the species Capsicum annuum.

Characteristics
The pepper is small and finger-long, slender, and thin-walled. Although it turns from green to red upon ripening, it is usually harvested while green. The name refers to the fact that the tip of the  looks like the  head; in Japanese, it is often abbreviated as shishitō.

About one out of every ten to twenty peppers is spicy. The occurrence of pungent fruit is induced by such factors as exposure to sunlight, and other environmental stresses.

The prefectural agricultural testing center at Kishigawa, Wakayama stated in 2005 that capsaicin forms more easily in hot and dry conditions in the summer, and even experts may not be able to distinguish relative hotness on the same plant.

For cooking, a hole is poked in the pepper beforehand to keep expanding hot air from bursting the pepper. It may be skewered then broiled (grilled), pan-fried in oil, stewed in a soy sauce– and dashi-based liquid, or simply eaten raw in a salad or as a condiment. It is thin-skinned and will blister and char easily compared with thicker-skinned varieties of peppers.

Gallery

See also
 Shichimi, chili pepper in Japan
 
 Padrón peppers, a similarly used pepper in Spain

References

Chili peppers
Fruit vegetables
Japanese vegetables
Capsicum cultivars
Korean vegetables